Carcinopodia furcifasciata is a moth of the  subfamily Arctiinae. It is found in Malawi.

References

Endemic fauna of Malawi
Lithosiini
Lepidoptera of Malawi
Moths of Sub-Saharan Africa